Gheorghe Bunea Stancu (born 24 December 1954) is a Romanian politician, member of the Partidul Social Democrat (PSD), the President of the Consiliul Local Judeţean Brăila and also President of CF Brăila.

References

1954 births
Living people
Social Democratic Party (Romania) politicians
Place of birth missing (living people)